Güdəcühür (also, Gyudadzhugur, Gyudadzhur, Gyudadzhyugy, and Gyudadzhyugyur) is a village and municipality in the Sabirabad Rayon of Azerbaijan.  It has a population of 1,691.

References 

Populated places in Sabirabad District